Yoav David Ziv (born 16 March 1981) is a retired Israeli footballer. He is currently the first team manager in Maccabi Tel Aviv. As a player he could perform on either flank of the formation, usually attacking from defence as he is adept with both feet, although he favoured the right.

Early life
Ziv was born in Hadera, Israel, to a Jewish family.

Club career
He started playing for Maccabi Haifa in the youth level, he was part of the team that won the 1998–99 season of the Israeli Noar Premier League. He later played with Hapoel Haifa and Hapoel Nazareth Illit with which he achieved promotion from the Liga Leumit to the Israeli Premier League.

In 2006, he moved to Beitar Jerusalem and established himself as a fan favourite, being able to play in both wings or both fullback positions, and even as a central defender. This came as a surprise since Ziv played as a striker in Nazareth.

Before the 2006/2007 seasons there were rumors that Ossie Ardiles might let Ziv go or that Ziv's role will diminish. Under Manager Yossi Mizrahi though, Yoav Ziv regained his status and became a more regular player in the starting lineup playing as the right wingback.

On 28 January 2009, Ziv was signed by Belgian club KSC Lokeren for a €75,000 transfer fee on a two-and-a-half-year contract from Beitar Jerusalem.

In April 2010 Maccabi Tel Aviv announced that Ziv signed a three-year contract with the club .
On 15 July Ziv made his official debut with the Maccabi at UEFA Europe League against FK Mogren and scored his first goal for Maccabi Tel Aviv. During the 2011–12 UEFA Europa League match against Stoke City, he kicked his loose boot at the assistant referee and was sent off.

In October 2016 signed to Liga Leumit club Hapoel Petah Tikva.

In July 2017, Ziv retired from football and was made the first team manager in Maccabi Tel Aviv.

International career
Ziv played a single match for the Israel national under-21 football team. On 15 August 2006, Ziv made his debut for the Israel national football team in a friendly against Slovenia in a game that finished 1–1.

Honours

Club
Maccabi Haifa
 Israeli Premier League: 
2000/2001

Beitar Jerusalem
 Israeli Premier League:2006–07, 2007–08
 Israel State Cup: 2007–08

Maccabi Tel Aviv 
 Israeli Premier League: 2012–13, 2013–14, 2014–15
 Israel State Cup: 2014–15 
 Toto Cup: 2014–15

References

External links
National Team Stats at IFA

1981 births
Israeli Jews
Living people
Israeli footballers
Maccabi Haifa F.C. players
Hapoel Haifa F.C. players
Hapoel Nof HaGalil F.C. players
Beitar Jerusalem F.C. players
K.S.C. Lokeren Oost-Vlaanderen players
Maccabi Tel Aviv F.C. players
Hapoel Petah Tikva F.C. players
Israeli Premier League players
Liga Leumit players
Belgian Pro League players
Footballers from Hadera
Israel international footballers
Israeli expatriate footballers
Expatriate footballers in Belgium
Israeli expatriate sportspeople in Belgium
Association football defenders